Crocydoscelus is a genus of moths in the family Pterophoridae containing one species, Crocydoscelus ferrugineum, which is known from the Republic of Congo and Nigeria.

References

Platyptiliini
Lepidoptera of West Africa
Fauna of the Republic of the Congo
Moths of Africa
Monotypic moth genera
Taxa named by Thomas de Grey, 6th Baron Walsingham